The blue-tailed day gecko (Phelsuma cepediana) is a diurnal species of gecko, a lizard in the family Gekkonidae. The species is endemic to the island Mauritius. It typically inhabits warm and humid places and dwells on different trees and bushes.

Additionally, it is noteworthy that the blue-tailed day gecko can change colors and patterns ontogenetically. Depending on the activity, coloration can differ.

Etymology
The specific name, cepediana, is in honor of French naturalist Bernard Germain de Lacépède.

Description

Phelsuma cepediana is a mid-sized day gecko. It can reach a total length (including tail) of 3.75-5.5″ (9.5-14cm). Female blue tailed geckos are usually smaller in size than the male.

Male blue tailed geckos are typically more vivid than female blue tailed geckos. The male body colour is light green or bluish green. The backs of males have a bright blue colour and are covered with dark red spots and dashes. The males have deep blue tails; this blue color may also be found on their face. Females lack the brilliant blue colour of the males. They have a bright green back and rust-coloured spots. There is always a dorso-lateral stripe present, which may be broken. A red stripe extends from the nostril to the shoulder.

Habitat and distribution
Blue tailed geckos and other reptiles are sensitive to artificial light at night and will change their behaviors as a result of being exposed to this light. These geckos are primarily diurnal, as are most of the geckos in their genus (Phelsuma). It has been found that blue tailed geckos will change their foraging behavior from diurnal to nocturnal in cases where they have artificial light sources at their disposal. Nocturnal activity includes agonistic or aggressive behaviors, courtship, and foraging. When artificial lights are used in nocturnal situations, it alters the amount of time and effort that visual predators will spend foraging.

The Phelsuma cepediana is one of only seven species of the Mascarene species that is still alive. This species is the sole pollinator and seed disperser of a climbing shrub, the Roussea simplex, which is endemic to the mountains of the Mauritius.  They can typically be found on trees and bushes that produce fruits, such as coconut palms, banana trees, and papayas. These locations are warm and moist climates, which are preferred by this gecko.

The blue-tailed day gecko inhabits the island Mauritius where it is widely distributed. P. cepediana may also have been introduced to Madagascar where it has been reported a few times, amongst others in the region of Iviloina. These observations have not been confirmed, however. Although these lizards seem to be unable to colonize agricultural areas, they can survive in suburban gardens that are heavily watered and planted as long as these gardens are near trees that produce fruit or flowers throughout the year.

Diet
The blue-tailed day gecko feeds on various insects and other invertebrates. It also licks soft, sweet fruit, pollen, and nectar. The flowers of the now critically endangered liana Roussea simplex produce copious amounts of nectar and are pollinated only by the blue-tailed day gecko. The blue-tailed day gecko plays a role by licking up a gelatinous substance secreted by the fruit which contains the minute seeds. It disperses the seeds in its droppings.

Behavior
This Phelsuma species can be quite aggressive both toward its own and to other Phelsuma species. In captivity, where the females cannot escape, the males sometimes seriously wound the female. In this case, the male and female must be separated.

Protective coloration and behavior 
Lizards can change in color and pattern ontogenetically. Conspicuous tail colors appear only in juveniles and can fade by adulthood. Research has been conducted in order to determine if these tail colors compensate for “an increased activity, level, deflecting imminent attacks to the tail.” Research has suggested that alteration of activities can affect the ontogenetic color and pattern changes. Lizards that are active and forage in habitats that are open tend to increase the probability that they will be attacked by ambush predators. Deflection displays and conspicuous colors can shift attacks to the expendable tail. By doing this, the prey’s overall likelihood of surviving the attack is increased.

Reproduction
Blue tailed geckos lay eggs every 3-4 weeks. They typically lay 2 eggs. 

The females will lay their eggs in a location that they feel is safe and protected. The geckos will glue their eggs in order to increase safety. When they are kept at a temperature of 28 degrees Celsius, the eggs take between 40 and 45 days to hatch. When the new borns are measured, they are normally around 40 mm or 1.6 inches.

Predators

These geckos frequently will hide amongst dense patches of palm-like Pandanus plants in order to protect themselves from their enemies. The Phelsuma cepediana is preyed on by critically endangered Mauritius kestrel. This bird feeds almost exclusively on Phelsuma geckos, making Phelsuma cepediana one of its main prey. Other birds that are endemic to Mauritius also feed off of Phelsuma geckos. 

The 2mm-long ant Technomyrmex albipes that was introduced to Mauritius from the Indo-Pacific area seals the flowers of Roussea with clay to protect mealy bugs. These drink the sap and excrete a sugary urine that is collected by the ants. The ants attack animals that visit the plant, preventing the blue-tailed day gecko from pollinating the flowers and eating from the fruit, and in this way seriously hampering Roussea's reproduction.

Captivity
Male Phelsuma cepediana are extremely high in demand as pets due to their vibrant coloration, and can cost $100 to $200 each. With good care, blue-tailed day geckos may live up to 15 years.

References

Further reading

Henkel, F.-W., and W. Schmidt (1995). Amphibien und Reptilien Madagaskars, der Maskarenen, Seychellen und Komoren. Ulmer Stuttgart. 
McKeown, Sean (1993). The general care and maintenance of day geckos. Advanced Vivarium Systems, Lakeside CA.

Phelsuma
Reptiles described in 1812
Endemic fauna of Mauritius